Kurt Honolka (27 September 1913 – 7 October 1988) was a German musicologist, journalist, and music and theatre critic. He is known as a translator of the librettos of Czech operas into German, such as Smetana's Dalibor and Janáček's Osud.

Career 
Born in Litoměřice, Bohemia, Honolka studied musicology and law at the German University in Prague,  and earned a Ph.D. in law. He worked almost exclusively as a musicologist. He became a member of the Nazi Party in 1939. He published in the daily newspapers Prager Tagblatt and Der neue Tag. From 1941, he wrote war reports (Kriegsberichte), for example Kampfflieger über England. Aus dem Tagebuch einer Kampffliegerstaffel (Fels-Verlag, Essen 1942), and Fliegerkameraden (Fels-Verlag, Essen 1944).

Honolka was a music critic for the Stuttgarter Nachrichten and editor of the Feuilleton section from 1949 to 1963. He also worked as a musicologist and translated several librettos of operas to German, especially those by Czech composers. He tried to revive forgotten works by notable composers by using new, more dramatic texts, for example Weber's Euryanthe and Schubert's Alfonso und Estrella. He also translated songs and choral music. His translation to German of Smetana's Dalibor was used in a new production in 2019 of the Oper Frankfurt.

Honolka received the Order of Merit of Baden-Württemberg in 1980. He was awarded the Schubart-Literaturpreis of the city of Aalen in 1986. He died in Stuttgart on 7 October 1988.

Works 
Publications by Honolka are held by the German National Library, including:

Books 
 Das vielstimmige Jahrhundert (1960)
 Musik im 20. Jahrhundert (1960)
 Der Musik gehorsame Tochter (1962)
 Knaurs Weltgeschichte der Musik Droemer Knaur 1968, New edition 1979, .
 Antonín Dvořák. Mit Selbstzeugnissen und Bilddokumenten Rowohlt 1974. (New edition 2002)
 Bedřich Smetana in Selbstzeugnissen und Bilddokumenten Rowohlt, Reinbek 1978, .
 Die großen Primadonnen. Vom Barock bis zur Gegenwart Heinrichshofen, Wilhelmshaven 1961. (New edition 1982)
 Leoš Janáček. Sein Leben – sein Werk – seine Zeit. Belser, Stuttgart/ Zürich 1982, .
 Papageno. Emanuel Schikaneder. Der große Theatermann der Mozart-Zeit. 1984,  .
 Schubart. Dichter und Musiker, Journalist und Rebell. Sein Leben, sein Werk. Stuttgart 1985, 
 Hugo Wolf – sein Leben, sein Werk, seine Zeit. Deutsche Verlags-Anstalt, Stuttgart 1988, .

Translations of opera librettos to German 
 Zwei Witwen by Smetana
 Die verkaufte Braut by Smetana
 Dalibor by Smetana
 Die Teufelskäthe by Dvořák
 Osud by Janáček
 Les vêpres siciliennes by Verdi
 Così fan tutte by Mozart
 Die Hochzeit des Figaro by Mozart
 Idomeneo by Mozart
 Amahl und die nächtlichen Besucher by Menotti
 Hilfe, Hilfe, die Globolinks'' by Menotti

Literature

References

External links 
 
 
  Dr. jur. Kurt Honolka sudetendeutsche-akademie.eu

1913 births
1988 deaths
People from Litoměřice
German theatre critics
German music critics
Nazi Party members
Recipients of the Order of Merit of Baden-Württemberg
20th-century German musicologists